Javier “Javi” Hernández Carrera (born 2 May 1998) is a Spanish footballer who plays as either a central defender or a left back for Girona FC, on loan from CD Leganés.

Club career
Born in Jerez de la Frontera, Cádiz, Andalusia, Hernández joined Real Madrid's youth setup in 2013, from Sevilla FC. On 17 July 2017, after finishing his formation, he was loaned to Segunda División B side CD El Ejido, for one year.

Hernández made his senior debut on 27 August 2017, starting and scoring his team's first in a 3–3 home draw against FC Cartagena. He finished the campaign as an undisputed starter, contributing with two goals in 33 matches.

On 13 July 2018, Hernández was loaned to Real Oviedo Vetusta also in the third division, until the end of the season. He made his first-team debut on 11 September, starting in a 0–1 away loss against RCD Mallorca for the season's Copa del Rey.

Hernández scored his first professional goal on 7 January 2019, netting the opener in a 3–2 away win against CD Numancia in the Segunda División. Upon returning, he was assigned to Real Madrid's B-team in the third division.

On 28 September 2020, Hernández agreed to a four-year deal with CD Leganés in the second division. On 19 August 2022, he was loaned to La Liga side Girona FC for the season.

Honours
Real Madrid
 La Liga: 2019–20

References

External links

1998 births
Living people
Footballers from Jerez de la Frontera
Spanish footballers
Association football defenders
Segunda División players
Segunda División B players
Real Madrid Castilla footballers
Real Oviedo Vetusta players
Real Oviedo players
CD Leganés players
Girona FC players